Amy Wong is a character from the animated series Futurama.

Amy Wong may also refer to:
Amy Wing-Hann Wong, Canadian visual artist
Amy Wong (producer), Hong Kong television drama producer